Tambovka is the name of several rural localities in Russia:
Tambovka, Amur Oblast, a selo in Tambovsky Rural Settlement of Tambovsky District of Amur Oblast
Tambovka, Astrakhan Oblast, a selo in Tambovsky Selsoviet of Kharabalinsky District of Astrakhan Oblast
Tambovka, Republic of Bashkortostan, a village in Polyakovsky Selsoviet of Davlekanovsky District of the Republic of Bashkortostan
Tambovka, Sargatsky District, Omsk Oblast, a village in Verblyuzhensky Rural Okrug of Sargatsky District of Omsk Oblast
Tambovka, Sedelnikovsky District, Omsk Oblast, a village in Yevlantyevsky Rural Okrug of Sedelnikovsky District of Omsk Oblast
Tambovka, Rostov Oblast, a khutor in Khleborobnoye Rural Settlement of Tselinsky District of Rostov Oblast
Tambovka, Samara Oblast, a selo in Bolsheglushitsky District of Samara Oblast
Tambovka, Saratov Oblast, a selo in Fyodorovsky District of Saratov Oblast
Tambovka, Talovsky District, Voronezh Oblast, a settlement in Anokhinskoye Rural Settlement of Talovsky District of Voronezh Oblast
Tambovka, Ternovsky District, Voronezh Oblast, a selo in Tambovskoye Rural Settlement of Ternovsky District of Voronezh Oblast